Martín Maximiliano Mantovani (born 7 July 1984) is an Argentine professional footballer who plays for FC Andorra as a centre-back.

Club career
Born in San Miguel, Corrientes, Mantovani played for local clubs as a youth, before joining Atlético Madrid in the 2006 summer. Initially assigned to the C-team, he went on to appear rarely with the reserves in the 2009–10 campaign, in Segunda División B.

On 10 August 2010, Mantovani moved to Cultural y Deportiva Leonesa, also in the third level. He subsequently represented CD Atlético Baleares and Real Oviedo, being an undisputed starter in both sides.

In June 2013, Mantovani was loaned to CD Leganés in the same division. He appeared in 39 matches during the season, as the Madrid side returned to Segunda División after a ten-year absence, and subsequently signed permanently on 30 June 2014.

On 5 October 2014, aged 30, Mantovani played his first match as a professional, starting in a 2–0 home win against CD Tenerife. He scored his first goal late in the month, netting his side's only in a 1–1 away draw against CD Numancia.

Mantovani appeared in 38 matches and scored two goals during the 2015–16 campaign, captaining his side in its first-ever promotion to La Liga. He made his debut in the category on 22 August 2016, starting in a 1–0 away win against Celta de Vigo.

After five seasons at Leganés, Mantovani left the team and signed a two-year contract with UD Las Palmas as a free agent. In March 2019, he joined SD Huesca on loan until the end of the season.

On 5 October 2020, Mantovani terminated his contract with the Canarians.

Career statistics

Club

References

External links

1984 births
Living people
Sportspeople from Corrientes Province
Argentine footballers
Association football defenders
La Liga players
Segunda División players
Segunda División B players
Tercera División players
Atlético Madrid C players
Atlético Madrid B players
Cultural Leonesa footballers
CD Atlético Baleares footballers
Real Oviedo players
CD Leganés players
UD Las Palmas players
SD Huesca footballers
FC Andorra players
Cadetes de San Martín players
Argentine expatriate footballers
Expatriate footballers in Spain
Expatriate footballers in Andorra
Argentine expatriate sportspeople in Spain
Argentine expatriate sportspeople in Andorra